The following is a list of Extreme Championship Wrestling attendance records. Established in 1992 by Tod Gordon as Eastern Championship Wrestling, the promotion was part of the National Wrestling Alliance for nearly a year before breaking away from the organization in August 1994. The split occurred under controversial circumstances when Shane Douglas infamously threw down the NWA World Heavyweight Championship moments after winning the title in a championship tournament. The promotion was subsequently rechristened "Extreme" Championship Wrestling and, under the creative dirction of booker Paul Heyman, saw its most successful period during the 1990s wrestling boom. By the end of the decade, ECW had successfully transitioned from a Northeastern U.S.-based independent promotion to a nationally touring company and was widely considered part of the 1990s-version of the "Big Three" with World Championship Wrestling and the World Wrestling Federation.

Events and attendances

Historical

See also
List of professional wrestling attendance records
List of professional wrestling attendance records in Canada
List of professional wrestling attendance records in Europe
List of professional wrestling attendance records in Japan
List of professional wrestling attendance records in Mexico
List of professional wrestling attendance records in Puerto Rico
List of professional wrestling attendance records in the United Kingdom
List of professional wrestling attendance records in the United States
List of WWE attendance records

Notes
 †  Retractable roof stadium
 *  Open air venue

References
General

Specific

External links
Cards With Highest Claimed Attendance from The Internet Wrestling Database
ECW Largest Verifiable Attendances at OSWReview.com
ECW attendance records at Wrestlingdata.com

Extreme Championship Wrestling
Professional wrestling attendances
Attendance records